The 1910 Case football team represented the Case School of Applied Science, now a part of Case Western Reserve University, during the 1910 college football season. The team's head coach was Joe Fogg.

Case handed Ohio State their only loss of the season and extended a four-game win streak against the Buckeyes, making Fogg a perfect 4–0 against Ohio State during his coaching tenure.

Schedule

References

Case
Case Western Reserve Spartans football seasons
Case football